Chandra is a village on the island of Anjouan in the Comoros. According to the 1991 census, the village had a population of 3,511. The current estimate for 2009 is 6,179 people.

References

Populated places in Anjouan